Gianluca Pablo Simeone Baldini (born 23 July 1998) is an Argentine professional footballer who plays as a centre-forward for Xerez Deportivo FC.

Career
Simeone began his career with River Plate, where he had a loan stint away with Frosinone. He was loaned out in 2018 to Chilean Primera División side Unión La Calera, with the forward making his senior debut on 20 June during a Copa Chile second round win over Magallanes. Simeone made two further appearances in the next round against Palestino, who were the eventual winners. He returned to River Plate without featuring in the league, though was an unused sub three times. In 2019, Simeone joined Argentine Primera División team Gimnasia y Esgrima. His debut versus Atlético Tucumán came soon after.

On 13 August 2019, Simeone was signed on loan by Segunda División B outfit UD Ibiza. He was, however, immediately moved to their reserve team, Sant Rafel, in the Tercera División. He scored on his second Sant Rafel appearance versus Formentera on 1 September. His first senior hat-trick arrived on 22 February 2020 against Santanyí. The centre-forward departed back to Gimnasia at the end of 2019–20, having scored thirteen goals in twenty-five matches. In August 2020, Simeone returned to Spain with Tercera División side CD Ibiza. He netted a hat-trick in his third game versus Sóller on 1 November.

Personal life
Simeone is the son of football manager Diego. His brothers Giovanni and Giuliano are also professional footballers.

Career statistics
.

References

External links

1998 births
Living people
Place of birth missing (living people)
Argentine footballers
Association football forwards
Argentine expatriate footballers
Expatriate footballers in Chile
Expatriate footballers in Spain
Argentine expatriate sportspeople in Chile
Argentine expatriate sportspeople in Spain
Argentine Primera División players
Tercera División players
Club Atlético River Plate footballers
Unión La Calera footballers
Club de Gimnasia y Esgrima La Plata footballers
UD Ibiza players
CF Sant Rafel players
CD Ibiza Islas Pitiusas players
Simeone family
Footballers from Buenos Aires